Ettivayal is a village in the Pattukkottai taluk of Thanjavur district, Tamil Nadu, India.

Demographics 

As per the 2001 census, Ettivayal had a total population of 1305 with 609 males and 696 females. The sex ratio was 1143. The literacy rate was 65.95.

References 

 

Villages in Thanjavur district